KRWV may refer to:

 Caldwell Municipal Airport (Texas) (ICAO code KRWV)
 KRWV-LP, a low-power radio station (99.3 FM) licensed to serve Gold Canyon, Arizona, United States